Anopheles culicifacies is a mosquito species complex and one of the major vectors of malaria on the Indian subcontinent. It consists of five sibling species, provisionally designated as species A, B, C, D, and E. It prefers to rest indoors in cattle sheds, where it feeds on cattle. The control of A. culicifacies has become difficult due to development of insecticide resistance against all commonly used insecticides, including new-generation insecticides such as synthetic pyrethroids.

It has a Culex-like sitting posture.

References 

Insect vectors of human pathogens
Insects described in 1901
culicifacies